Avocet is the common name of a genus of wading birds, Recurvirostra.

Avocet may also refer to:

Avocet snipe eel, a fish
Avro Avocet, a 1920s British naval fighter aircraft prototype
Avocet Mining, a West African company
Avocet (album), by Bert Jansch
USS Avocet (AVP-4), a 1918–1946 US Navy minesweeper
USS Avocet  (AMCU-16), a 1953–1960 US Navy minesweeper
 Avocet, a 1986 prototype locomotive of the British Rail Class 89